Flight of the Eagle is a Swedish biographical drama film which was released to cinemas in Sweden on 26 August 1982, directed by Jan Troell, based on Per Olof Sundman's 1967 novelization of the true story of S. A. Andrée's Arctic balloon expedition of 1897, an ill-fated effort to reach the North Pole in which all three expedition members perished. The film stars Max von Sydow as S.A. Andrée, Sverre Anker Ousdal as Knut Frænkel and Göran Stangertz as Nils Strindberg. Dutch-Swedish songwriter Cornelis Vreeswijk plays the role of the journalist Lundström.

The film was nominated for the Academy Award for Best Foreign Language Film at the 55th Academy Awards. Many sequences from the film were used in the 1997 documentary A Frozen Dream (En frusen dröm), also directed by Troell.

Cast
 Max von Sydow as Salomon August Andrée
 Göran Stangertz as Nils Strindberg
 Sverre Anker Ousdal as Knut Frænkel
 Clément Harari as Henri Lachambre
 Eva von Hanno as Gurli Linder
 Lotta Larsson as Anna Charlier
 Jan-Olof Strandberg as Nils Ekholm
 Henric Holmberg as Vilhelm Swedenborg
 Ulla Sjöblom as Andrée's Sister
 Mimi Pollak as Mina Andrée
 Cornelis Vreeswijk as Lundström
 Ingvar Kjellson as Alfred Nobel
 Bruno Sörwing as Oscar II of Sweden
 Åke Wihlney as The Captain
 Berto Marklund as The Ship's Doctor
 Knut Husebø as Fridtjof Nansen
 Allan Schulman as Adolf Erik Nordenskiöld
 Staffan Liljander as The Inventor
 Lasse Pöysti as Photographer
 Peter Schildt as Andrée's clerk
 Siv Ericks as Mrs. Assarsson

Production
The early drafts for a script were written in 1977, and the same year a team consisting of Jan Troell, the producer Bengt Forslund, the original writer of the novel Per Olof Sundman and a few other people went to Spitsbergen for location scouting. Troell was at the time in the post-production process of his film Bang!, and when Bang! was selected for the 1977 Cannes Film Festival, the plan was to use the festival to attract investors. However, Bang! was poorly received and the interest faded even from the Swedish Film Institute. The project was put on hold and Troell went to the United States to direct Hurricane, an assignment he was offered after the previous director Roman Polanski had suddenly left the country to avoid sentencing for unlawful sexual intercourse with a thirteen-year-old in Los Angeles.

When Troell returned to Sweden, and the film institute had gotten Jörn Donner as its new managing director, the project was revived. In May 1979 the new writing process started, this time led by Georg Oddner and Klaus Rifbjerg, with Donner himself as producer. The financing was difficult, not least because it coincided with the making of Fanny and Alexander, at the time the most expensive Swedish film ever made. However, Troell said he regarded all the film's expensive visuals as "background", and that "What excited me was the tragic quest and the characters of Andrée and his comrades.

Release
The film premiered on 26 August 1982 in Gränna, the hometown of Andrée. It was entered into the 1982 Venice Film Festival, where Max von Sydow won the Pasinetti Award for Best Actor. A VHS version was released in Sweden in November 2000. Distributor Studio S released a blu-ray edition, with Swedish and English subtitles, on 9 October 2017.

Critical reception
The Swedish critics were generally very positive about the film. It was praised for its attention to detail and how complete it felt in a review in Göteborgs-Posten by Monika Tunbäck-Hanson: "It is the overall approach and the firm hand that contemporary Swedish films so often lack. Jan Troell lacks neither." Hans Erik Hjertén at Dagens Nyheter made a comparison to Troell's previous films: "The smallness of the humans, ripped from the larger community, is cleverly demonstrated by Troell by letting Strindberg at a distance cover his comrades with a single finger! In such details, the storyteller Troell has always had his strength and has it here too, but he is more restrained than before, it appears to me. Here is not the same profusion of lyrical whims as in previous films."

Internationally the film was also well received. Vincent Canby expressed in a review for The New York Times how he would like to know more about which parts of the story that were derived directly from Andrée's journal and which were speculation. He further wrote that the film "leaves a lot of questions unanswered. Yet the adventure is both panoramic and unusually intimate. Toward the end of the expedition, the personal drama of the three men, as they are overtaken by fate, is detailed with an intensity that is as moving as the earlier sequences are spectacular."

See also
 List of submissions to the 55th Academy Awards for Best Foreign Language Film
 List of Swedish submissions for the Academy Award for Best Foreign Language Film

References

External links

1982 films
1980s biographical drama films
West German films
1980s Swedish-language films
Films set on balloons
Films directed by Jan Troell
Films set in the Arctic
Swedish biographical drama films
Norwegian biographical drama films
German biographical drama films
Films set in the 1890s
1982 drama films
1980s German films
1980s Swedish films